Rodolfo Biagi (March 14, 1906, in Buenos Aires – September 24, 1969) was an Argentine Tango musician who started his musical career by playing background pianist for silent movies, and this was where he was first discovered by a tango band leader.

As a tango pianist, he played with several orchestras, including the orchestra of Juan d'Arienzo from 1935 to 1938, and is often partly credited with the development of d'Arienzo's rhythmic style. He later formed his own orchestra, and the special rhythmic qualities of his music are easily recognisable.

External links
Rodolfo Biagi at todotango.com
Rodolfo Biagi at tango.info
Rodolfo Biagi Biography (El Recodo Tango)
Rodolfo Biagi Discography (El Recodo Tango)

1906 births
1969 deaths
Argentine people of Italian descent
Argentine tango musicians
Musicians from Buenos Aires